Ana Menéndez (born 1970 in Los Angeles) is an American writer and journalist.

Early life
Menéndez was born to Cuban exile parents who fled to Los Angeles, California in 1964.  Menéndez's parents expected to return to Cuba at any time and prepared their children for this eventuality. As a result, Menéndez spoke only Spanish until she enrolled in kindergarten. The family later moved first to Tampa, Florida, and then Miami, Florida, where Menéndez went to high school. Menéndez received her Bachelor of Arts from Florida International University in 1992.

Career
Menéndez spent six years as a journalist in the 1990s. She began at the Miami Herald in 1991, where she covered the Miami neighborhood of Little Havana, and then moved to the Orange County Register in California. After pursuing a literary career for several years, she returned to the Miami Herald in 2005 as a columnist. In 2008, Menéndez took a leave of absence from the Miami Herald to accept a Fulbright grant to teach at the American University in Cairo.

In 1997, Menéndez entered the Creative Writing Program at New York University, where she was a New York Times fellow. Her collection of short stories, In Cuba I Was a German Shepherd, was published shortly after her graduation in 2001. The New York Times named it a Notable Book of The Year and the title story won the Pushcart Prize for short fiction. Menéndez published her first novel, Loving Che, in 2003. Her third book, The Last War, was published by HarperCollins in June 2009. Adios, Happy Homeland! a book of linked, formally experimental short stories was published in 2011.

See also

List of Cuban American writers
List of Cuban Americans

References

Further reading 
Alvarez Borland, Isabel. “Figures of Identity: Ana Menéndez’s and Guillermo Cabrera Infante’s Photographs.” Cuban-American Literature and Art: Negotiating Identities. Ed. Isabel Alvarez Borland and Lynette M. F. Bosch. Albany: SUNY P, 2009. 31–45.
Kadiyoti, Dalia. “Consuming Nostalgia: Nostalgia and the Marketplace in Cristina García and Ana Menéndez.” MELUS 31.1 (2006): 81–97.
Kakutani, Michiko. “As the Day Wanes, Missing the Cuban Sun.” Rev. of In Cuba I Was A German Shepherd, by Ana Menéndez. New York Times 19 June 2001: E8.
.
Sims, Robert L. “Che Guevara, Nostalgia, Photography, Felt History and Narrative Discourse in Ana Menéndez’s Loving Che.” Hipertexto 11 (2010): 103 –16.
Socolovsky, Maya. “Cuba Interrupted: The Loss of Center and Story in Ana Menéndez’s In Cuba I Was a German Shepherd.” Critique 46.3 (2005): 235–51.
Sutherland, Julia. “Cuban Missives: Ana Menéndez’s Plot Is Layered with Pas- sions Both Sexual and Political.” Rev. of Loving Che, by Ana Menéndez. Financial Times 31 Jan. 2004: 31.
Whitfield, Esther. “Umbilical Chords.” Rev. of In Cuba I Was a German Shepherd, by Ana Menéndez. Women's Review of Books 18 (2001): 31.
Zaleski, Jeff. Rev. of In Cuba I Was A German Shepherd, by Ana Menéndez. Publishers Weekly 7 May 2001: 221.

External links

21st-century American novelists
American expatriates in Egypt
American women novelists
American writers of Cuban descent
Miami Herald people
Florida International University alumni
1970 births
Living people
Hispanic and Latino American novelists
Hispanic and Latino American women journalists
21st-century American women writers
21st-century American non-fiction writers